Teulisna tricornuta is a moth in the family Erebidae. It was described by Jeremy Daniel Holloway in 2001. It is found on Borneo. The habitat consists of lower montane areas.

The wingspan is about 11 mm.

References

Moths described in 2001
tricornuta